The following events occurred in September 1963:

September 1, 1963 (Sunday)
The Commonwealth Marriage Act 1961 took full effect in Australia, creating a national law concerning domestic relations.
A unidentified visitor to Lenin's Mausoleum, in Moscow, entered the shrine with a bomb concealed under his coat, and then detonated the explosive, killing himself and causing an unspecified amount of damage and injuries.  The event was not reported in the Soviet press and would not be revealed until after the breakup of the Soviet Union.
At the annual meeting of the Quebec wing of the Social Credit Party of Canada in Granby, Quebec, delegates voted to form a new party.  However, the Ralliement créditiste du Québec would not come into being until 1970.
About 100,000 people in two Japanese cities demonstrated against the presence of American nuclear submarines.
Kilkenny GAA defeated Waterford GAA in the 1963 All-Ireland Senior Hurling Championship Final at Croke Park, Dublin.
The Austrian Grand Prix was held at Zeltweg Airfield and won by Jack Brabham.

September 2, 1963 (Monday)
At 6:30 pm New York time, Walter Cronkite introduced the CBS Evening News with the statement, "Good evening from our CBS newsroom in New York, on this, the first broadcast of network television's first half-hour news program."  The first show included a prerecorded segment of Cronkite's interview with U.S. President Kennedy.  Previously, the three networks ran their daily national news for fifteen minutes.  NBC would inaugurate its half hour news program a week later, although ABC would not follow suit until 1967.
Born: Robbie Buhl, American Indy Racing League competitor and team-owner, in Detroit
Died: Fazlollah Zahedi, 70, former Prime Minister of Iran (1953–1955)

September 3, 1963 (Tuesday)
Jin Yong's wuxia novel Demi-Gods and Semi-Devils 天龙八部 (小说) began its serialisation in the newspapers Ming Pao in Hong Kong and Nanyang Siang Pau in Singapore.
The United States federal minimum wage was increased to $1.25 an hour ($ in  dollars). Fifty years later, the minimum wage would be $7.25 an hour.
A Mission Planning Coordination Group was established at the request of the Gemini Project Office to review monthly activities in operations, network guidance and control, and trajectories and orbits; and to ensure the coordination of various Manned Spacecraft Center elements actively concerned with Gemini mission planning. Its first meeting was scheduled for September 9 to discuss Gemini mission planning documentation, Gemini-Titan (GT) 1 mission plan, MISTRAM (missile tracking and measurement system) requirements and use of the J-1 computer, and mission objectives and tests for GT-2 and GT-3.
This function had originally been intended for the reentry control system (RCS), currently suffering from serious development problems. The revised design would also permit RCS propellants to be dumped before deploying the main recovery parachute. GPO outlined a three-phase drop test program to develop the drogue chute and qualify the revised recovery system. Phase I, scheduled for January and February 1964 and using boilerplate No. 5 as a test vehicle, would develop the technique of deploying the pilot parachute by the stabilization chute. At , the astronaut would release the stabilization chute. A lanyard connecting the stabilization and pilot chutes would then deploy the pilot chute. Two and one-half seconds later, the rendezvous and recovery (R and R) section would separate from the spacecraft, allowing the main chute to deploy. Phase II of the drop test program, scheduled for March through August 1964 and using a parachute test vehicle (an instrumented weight bomb), would complete development of the stabilization chute. From June through October 1964, Phase III tests would qualify the recovery system, using static article No. 7, a boilerplate pressure vessel and heatshield equipped with production RCS and R and R sections. Since this program was not expected to be finished before the third Gemini mission, qualification of the existing system was to be completed with three more drops in February and March 1964. Static article No. 7 would serve as the test vehicle before being diverted to Phase III testing.
Died: Louis MacNeice, 55, Irish poet and dramatist, of pneumonia developed from bronchitis contracted while caving on the Yorkshire moors.

September 4, 1963 (Wednesday)
Sennin Buraku became the first late night anime to be broadcast on Japanese television.

All 80 people aboard Swissair Flight 306, a jet airliner on its way to Rome, were killed when the aircraft crashed shortly after takeoff from Zurich. The plane, a Sud Aviation Caravelle, caught fire and came down near the town of Dürrenäsch. Most of the 44 passengers were from the tiny village of Humlikon, including the town's mayor and its entire city council, all of whom had planned to disembark at Geneva for a visit to an agricultural experiment station.
Representatives of Manned Spacecraft Center's Instrumentation and Electronics Systems Division and McDonnell met to coordinate the Gemini radar program. Gemini Project Office had requested an increased effort to put the rendezvous radar system in operational status.
For the first time ever, black students registered at white schools in the segregated state of Alabama; in some places, they faced state troopers deployed by Governor George Wallace to prevent integration. That night, the bombing of a black household in Birmingham triggered a riot, and a black 20-year-old was shot to death by police.
Died: Robert Schuman, 77, Luxembourg-born French politician who served twice as Prime Minister of France in 1947 and 1948

September 5, 1963 (Thursday)
British model and showgirl Christine Keeler was arrested for perjury, after witnesses established that she had lied under oath in the criminal trial of Aloysius Gordon in the course of the Profumo affair.
Lockheed's contract for the Gemini Agena target vehicle (GATV) was amended. As a result of the seven-and-one-half-month relaxation of the required launch date for the first GATV, Lockheed was directed to use the improved version of the standard Agena, the AD-62 block of vehicles, instead of AD-13. The AD-62 block originally included the multistart engine, subsequently slipped to the AD-71 block. Lockheed accordingly was directed in January 1964 to substitute the AD-71 for AD-62. The combined effect of these changes was to use up much of the seven-and-one-half-month leeway. The change to AD-62 caused a two-month slip, and changing to AD-71 added a five-week slip. With much of the contingency time gone, the Agena schedule was now tight, and further slippage threatened to cause launch delays.

September 6, 1963 (Friday)
The United States National Security Council launched the Krulak–Mendenhall mission to South Vietnam.
Professors Daniel Bastian and Hubert Forestier founded the Centre for International Industrial Property Studies (CEIPI) as part of the University of Strasbourg.
The 100,000th American major league baseball game was played, the milestone having been calculated by baseball historians from the first official game, played on May 4, 1871 by the National Association of Professional Base Ball Players. In game number 100,000 the Washington Senators defeated the visiting Cleveland Indians, 7 to 2. In the 1871 season opener, the Fort Wayne Kekiongas had defeated the visiting Cleveland Forest City team, 2 to 0.
The U.S. Department of Defense approved the Titan II Augmented Engine Improvement Program. On November 15, Aerojet-General received a U.S. Air Force contract to develop and test new engine components to correct weak and potentially dangerous problem areas of engine design. Aerojet-General had already initiated the development effort on September 30. The goal was to enhance engine reliability by a complete redesign rather than resort to piecemeal fixes as problems came up. While the primary goal was not achieved, the program did yield several side benefits, including the correction of several minor design deficiencies, the improvement of welding techniques, and the development of better assembly procedures.
The formal Combined Systems Acceptance Test (CSAT) of Gemini launch vehicle No. 1 was conducted in the vertical test facility at Martin-Baltimore. Two preliminary CSAT dry runs had been conducted on August 2 and 17, in conjunction with Electronic-Electrical Interference (EEI) Tests. A third CSAT with EEI monitoring had been run on September 3 to clarify checkout procedures and recheck EEI results. CSAT included a complete launch countdown, simulated engine start, liftoff, and flight through stage II engine shutdown, ending with the simulated injection of the spacecraft into Earth orbit. Both primary and secondary guidance and control combinations were tested. Martin engineers reviewed the test data collected by aerospace ground equipment recorders and telemetry and presented the vehicle for final acceptance to the Air Force Space Systems Division/Aerospace Vehicle Acceptance Team on September 11.
Born: Mark Chesnutt, American country music singer, in Beaumont, Texas

September 7, 1963 (Saturday)
The Pro Football Hall of Fame opened in Canton, Ohio, with 17 charter members. 
Born: Eazy-E (Eric Lyn Wright), American rapper and co-founder of the group N.W.A (Niggaz Wit Attitudes); in Compton, California (died of AIDS, 1995)

September 8, 1963 (Sunday)
Voters in Algeria overwhelmingly approved that nation's first constitution, in a referendum with a 96.8% yes vote.
Félix Houphouët-Boigny, President of Côte d'Ivoire, relinquished his additional post of Minister of Foreign Affairs, replacing it with the ministries of Defense, the Interior, and Agriculture.
The 16 NASA astronauts began training in water and land parachute landing techniques. This training was necessary because in low level abort (under ) the pilot would be ejected from the Gemini spacecraft and would descend by personnel parachute. A towed  diameter parasail carried the astronauts to altitudes as high as  before the towline was released and the astronaut glided to a landing.
Died: Stone Johnson, United States Olympic sprinter and Kansas City Chiefs kick returner and running back; as a result of in-game injury sustained on August 30

September 9, 1963 (Monday)
Operation 34A, authorizing American secret operations against North Vietnam, was approved by U.S. Army General Maxwell D. Taylor, who at that time was the Chairman of the Joint Chiefs of Staff.
NBC became the second U.S. television network to expand its evening news from 15 minutes to 30.  As CBS did the week before, The Huntley-Brinkley Report included an interview with President Kennedy.
The Fourth Session of the United Nations Committee on the Peaceful Uses of Outer Space opened at United Nations Headquarters, New York.
Died: Ernst Kantorowicz, 68, German historian

September 10, 1963 (Tuesday)
For the first time in the history of Major League Baseball, three brothers appeared for the same team in a game. Felipe Alou, Jesús Alou  and Matty Alou  took the outfield (at right, center and left field, respectively) for the San Francisco Giants against the New York Mets.  In the 8th inning, Jesús, Matty and Felipe came up to bat in consecutive order, and were all struck out by Mets pitcher Carl Willey; the Mets won 4-2.
Italian Mafia boss Bernardo Provenzano was indicted for murder.  Eight days later, he would become a fugitive, and would not be captured until 43 years later, on April 11, 2006.
U.S. President Kennedy issued an executive order that exempted married American men from being drafted.

September 11, 1963 (Wednesday)
A chartered Vickers 610 Viking airplane, flying from London to Perpignan, France, crashed into the side of the Roc de la Roquette, a mountain in the Pyrenees Range, killing all 40 people on board. All 36 passengers were British tourists. Earlier in the day, another Vickers airplane, an Indian Airlines Viscount turboprop, crashed while en route from Nagpur to New Delhi, killing all 18 people on board.
The Virginia Supreme Court ruled that a state law, requiring segregated seating in publicly owned ballparks, was unconstitutional.
Following up Gemini Project Office's request to bring the Gemini rendezvous radar system to operational status, on September 11 and 12 Manned Spacecraft Center Instrumentation and Electronics System Division personnel met with Westinghouse at Baltimore to review the test program. Westinghouse had completed its radio frequency anechoic chamber test, but test anomalies could not be pinpointed to the radar system, since chamber reflections might have been responsible. An outdoor range test was planned to determine whether the chamber was suitable for testing the radar.
Between September 11 and 20, the vehicle acceptance team for Gemini launch vehicle (GLV) 1 inspected the vehicle and reviewed its manufacturing and testing history, focusing on the results of the Combined Systems Acceptance Test (CSAT) of September 6. The team found GLV-1 to be unacceptable, primarily because of severely contaminated electrical connectors. In addition, the qualification of a number of major components had not been properly documented. Between September 21 and 29, Martin engineers inspected all of the 350 electrical connectors on GLV-1 for contamination and found 180 requiring cleaning or replacement. All electrical connectors on GLV-2 were also reinspected and cleaned or replaced as needed. This extensive inspection invalidated much previous testing, requiring sub-system tests and CSAT to be rerun. Preliminary CSAT was completed October 2, final CSAT October 4.
Died: Suzanne Duchamp, 73, French Dadaist painter and sister of Marcel Duchamp

September 12, 1963 (Thursday)
All 36 passengers and four crew of a chartered airliner were killed when the twin-engine VC.1 Viking crashed into a French mountain peak during a thunderstorm. The passengers were all British vacationers who were on their way to the mountain resort town of Perpignan after having departed from London.
The Ankara Agreement was signed in the capital of Turkey, between representatives of the European Economic Community (EEC) and Turkey, and provided for gradual entrance of Turkey into the European Community.
Died: Modest Altschuler, 90, Belarusian cellist, orchestral conductor, and composer

September 13, 1963 (Friday)
The White House confirmed in a press release that U.S. President Kennedy would be making a trip to Dallas, Texas later in the year, though the specific itinerary was not complete; the Dallas Times-Herald reported that Kennedy would have "a breakfast in Dallas, luncheon in Fort Worth, coffee in San Antonio and dinner in Houston."
The charter creating the Organisation of African Unity entered into force, after having been signed on May 25.
Mary Kay Cosmetics was incorporated by a Texas widow, Mary Kay Ash, who invested her life savings of $5,000. By the time of her death in 2001, the company had sales of $1.4 billion.
Russian dramatist and KGB agent Yuri Krotkov defected to the west while in London.
The Glen Canyon Dam, in the U.S. state of Arizona, was "topped out" with the pouring of the last concrete.
Barbra Streisand married for the first time at the age of 21, in a wedding to film actor Elliott Gould; they would divorce in 1971.
Born: Robin Smith, England cricketer, in Durban, South Africa
Died: Eduardo Barrios, 78, Chilean novelist and playwright

September 14, 1963 (Saturday)
The Tokyo Convention, officially the "Convention on Offences and Certain Other Acts Committed On Board Aircraft", was signed in Japan. Upon ratification by twelve nations, the treaty would enter into force on December 4, 1969.
D. C. Thomson & Co. published the first issue of The Hornet.
Astronomer Zenon M. Pereyra discovered Comet Pereyra, extremely bright with an apparent magnitude of 2, from an observatory near Córdoba, Argentina; it would last be seen from Earth on December 18.
Gemini Project Office reported a delay of about three weeks in the battery qualification program. McDonnell had sent a team to investigate the problem of high porosity welds in titanium battery cases. Another problem had turned up with the batteries in prequalification vibration test. The batteries vibrated excessively, although they did not fail electrically; the vibration's amplification factor was apparently low enough to be remedied by potting.
Born: The Fischer quintuplets (Mary Ann, Mary Catherine, Mary Margaret, Mary Magdalene and James Andrew Fischer), the first American born quintuplets to survive infancy, and only the third in world history; in Aberdeen, South Dakota.
Died: Alvin Boyd Kuhn, 82, American theosophy scholar

September 15, 1963 (Sunday)
Ahmed Ben Bella was elected, without opposition, as the first President of Algeria.

A time bomb exploded in the basement of the Sixteenth Street Baptist Church in Birmingham, Alabama, killing four African-American girls and injuring 22 other children who were attending a Sunday school class. The blast happened at 10:22 a.m., in a room with 80 children. Denise McNair was 11, and Carole Robertson, Cynthia Wesley and Addie Mae Collins were all 14. Robert Edward Chambliss, a white member of racist United Klans of America who put the bomb together, would finally be convicted of the children's murder on November 18, 1977. Thomas Blanton, Jr., who drove the group to the church, would be tried and convicted in 2001, and Bobby Frank Cherry, who planted the bomb, would finally be convicted of murder on May 22, 2002, almost 39 years after the killing.
The Beatles and The Rolling Stones performed in the same show for the first and only time, appearing at a concert at Royal Albert Hall in London.

September 16, 1963 (Monday)
Malaysia was formed through the merger of the 11 states of the Federation of Malaya and the British colonies of Singapore, North Borneo (renamed Sabah) and Sarawak.
In Fort-Lamy, Chad, anti-government demonstrations were quelled with 300 dead.
Hurricane Cindy formed 200 miles (322 km) east-northeast of Brownsville, Texas, US. 
The science fiction anthology television show, The Outer Limits, premiered on the ABC television network at 7:30 pm in the United States, beginning with the episode "The Galaxy Being".

September 17, 1963 (Tuesday)
In Iran's Parliamentary elections, the New Iran Party won 140 of the 200 seats.  The party's leader, Hassan Ali Mansur, would become the new Prime Minister.
Near the town of Chualar, California, 32 people died and 25 were injured when their makeshift bus (a flatbed truck with two long benches and a canopy) was struck by a train.  The truck was carrying 56 migrant farm workers, mostly from Mexico, and was returning from a celery field at the end of the day.  Twenty-two of the men died at the scene, and another ten died of their injuries later.
On television, David Janssen made his first appearance in the title role of The Fugitive, portraying Dr. Richard Kimble, a physician who had wrongfully been convicted of murder. Barry Morse portrayed Indiana detective Philip Gerard, whose relentless pursuit of Kimble would end with the series finale on August 29, 1967.

September 18, 1963 (Wednesday)

Rioters burned down the British Embassy in Jakarta, Indonesia, in protest at the formation of Malaysia.
The first flight of the ASSET project, (Aerothermodynamic-elastic Structural Systems Environmental Tests), a winged space payload vehicle, was carried out, to develop a manned spacecraft which could return from orbit and land on a runway. 
The Patty Duke Show premiered on television, with actress Patty Duke playing two roles as "identical cousins".  Camera tricks allowed Duke to appear as both Patty Lane and her look-alike cousin Cathy Lane.
The last sports event took place at the Polo Grounds in New York City, with baseball's New York Mets losing to the Philadelphia Phillies, 5-1 before a crowd of only 1,752 people.  When the game ended, the fans ran onto the field, vandalizing the scoreboard and the sod on the field, as well as some of the seats in the stadium, which was scheduled to be torn down in 1964.

September 19, 1963 (Thursday)
Iota Phi Theta, an African-American collegiate fraternity, was founded with the first chapter organized at Morgan State College.  There are now 249 chapters of the fraternity.
At the United Nations, Soviet Foreign Minister Andrei Gromyko announced that the U.S.S.R. was prepared to negotiate and sign a treaty to prohibit the orbiting of nuclear weapons platforms in outer space.  The Outer Space Treaty would be signed in 1967.
Balwantrai Mehta succeeded Jivraj Narayan Mehta as Chief Minister of the State of Gujarat. 
Born: Jarvis Cocker, English musician, in Sheffield
Died: 
Agnès Humbert, 68, French art historian, ethnographer and Resistance member 
David Low, 72, New Zealand political cartoonist

September 20, 1963 (Friday)
At the United Nations, U.S. President John F. Kennedy proposed a joint moon mission between the US and the Soviet Union.  The Soviet Union Communist Party newspaper Pravda reported the speech, but commented that the idea as "premature".  Kennedy would die two months later, Soviet Chairman Khrushchev would be deposed within 13 months, and the United States would proceed alone in its lunar program.
The first successful prenatal blood transfusion in history was performed in New Zealand at the National Women's Hospital at Auckland.  Dr. William Liley carried out the transfusion on the unborn son of a woman identified only as "Mrs. E. McLeod" in order to treat the fetus for hemolytic disease. The baby was born later in the day.

September 21, 1963 (Saturday)
The People's Action Party, led by Lee Kuan Yew, began its domination of politics in Singapore, winning 37 of 51 seats in Singapore's first parliamentary elections since independence.
The Place des Arts opened in Montreal, Quebec, Canada.
Joe Morgan, a second baseman formerly with the Modesto Colts, made his Major League Baseball debut for the Houston Colt .45s and began a career that would lead to his induction in baseball's Hall of Fame.
On the same day, Mario Andretti participated in his first major auto race, competing at Allentown, Pennsylvania in a United States Auto Club race.

September 22, 1963 (Sunday)
South Korea began its commitment to the Vietnam War, sending the first of 312,853 soldiers who would fight against the North Vietnamese. 
Viliam Siroky was removed from his position as Prime Minister of Czechoslovakia, after 10 years in office, and replaced by Jozef Lenárt.  In what was viewed as a purge of the remaining Stalinists, President and Czechoslovakian Party leader Antonín Novotný cited Siroky's "past political mistakes" as the reason for Siroky's abrupt departure.
Born: Armando Castagna, Italian speedway rider, in Arzignano
Died: Arthur Higgins, 71, Australian cinematographer

September 23, 1963 (Monday)
A Saudi royal decree established King Fahd University for Petroleum and Minerals as the "College of Petroleum and Minerals".
Haiti and the Dominican Republic, on the west side and east side, respectively, of the Caribbean island of Hispaniola, prepared for war. Dominican president Juan Bosch threatened to drop bombs on the presidential palace of Haiti's Francois Duvalier, after artillery shells rained across the border on the Dominican Republic town of Dajabón. Haiti, in turn, accused the Dominican Republic of firing weapons on the neighboring Haitian town of Ouanaminthe. The nations would later take their grievances to the Organization of American States without going to war.
A technical development plan for Department of Defense experiments to be carried on Gemini missions was issued. The plan described 13 Air Force experiments and nine Navy experiments costing an estimated $22 million. Manned Spacecraft Center reviewed the experiments for feasibility while the plan was being prepared, but their inclusion on Gemini flights was tentative, pending further technical definition of the experiments themselves and clarification of spacecraft weight and volume constraints.

September 24, 1963 (Tuesday)
The U.S. Senate ratified the Nuclear Test Ban Treaty by an overwhelming majority, 80-19, fourteen more than the two-thirds majority required by the U.S. Constitution. John F. Kennedy considered the ratification of the treaty, which would go into effect on October 11, the greatest achievement of his presidency, according to aide Theodore Sorensen.
Yaakov Herzog, a deputy at the Foreign Ministry of Israel, secretly met in London with King Hussein of Jordan, beginning a dialogue between the two neighboring nations that were, officially, enemies. King Hussein had suggested the meeting, explaining later that "One had to break that barrier... whether it led anywhere or not."
The rural-themed situation comedy Petticoat Junction began a seven season run on CBS television, after producer Paul Henning's success with The Beverly Hillbillies. Bea Benaderet, who had portrayed Pearl Bodine mother on the first show, starred as Kate Bradley, as the operator of a hotel accessible only by train. Petticoat Junction was not a spinoff of The Beverly Hillbillies, although, in later years, the characters from the two shows would appear in crossover episodes.
Eighteen people were killed and twelve seriously injured in the explosion of a fireworks factory at the Italian city of Caserta. The factory owner, who was killed in the blast, had reportedly been asking the employees to rush to produce additional fireworks for the festival of Saint Michael the Archangel.

September 25, 1963 (Wednesday)

Dominican Republic President Juan Bosch was overthrown in a military coup, only seven months after he had become the nation's first democratically elected leader.  Military leaders installed a group of three civilians, headed by Emilio de Los Santos as President, to preside over the nation.
The U.S. House of Representatives voted 271-155 to approve the reduction of the federal income tax rate.  The bill would pass the U.S. Senate, and be signed into law on February 26, 1964.
The Denning Report on the Profumo affair was published in Great Britain.  The report concluded that Prime Minister Harold Macmillan, and the rest of his cabinet, had not been aware of the indiscretions of War Minister John Profumo. 
Einar Gerhardsen was appointed as Prime Minister of Norway for the fourth time, after the resignation of John Lyng.  He would serve until October 12, 1965.

September 26, 1963 (Thursday)
After only one day on the FBI's Ten Most Wanted Fugitives list, bank robber Carl Close was arrested by local authorities in Anderson, South Carolina.  Close had just robbed a branch of the First National Bank in Anderson, and was stopped by a detective three minutes later while trying to commandeer another car.
A 38-year-old man from Waynesville, North Carolina, crashed his pickup truck through the closed iron gates of the White House, stopping short of hitting the building.  The unarmed man, who reportedly demanded to see President Kennedy and shouted that "the Communists are taking over in North Carolina", was taken to a hospital for observation.  The President was out at the time. 
A panicked elephant was chased for 90 minutes through the streets of Lansing, Michigan, after running away from an outdoor circus at a shopping center, injuring one man and causing extensive damage to a department store.  "Little Rajjee", a 16-year old elephant, was performing at the King Circus at the parking lot of South Logan Shopping Center when she got loose.  Pursued by hundreds of curious people, she fractured the pelvis of a bystander, and rampaged through a residential south Lansing neighborhood, before crashing through the doors of Arlan's Department Store on Fenton Street.  Her handlers had her under control twice, but Rajje was panicked by a mob inside the store and by a burglar alarm before city police shot and killed her.
T. S. Eliot's Collected Poems 1909–1962, selected by the author, were published on his 75th birthday.
Born:
Vladimír Chovan, Slovak politician and Agricultural Minister
Joe Nemechek, American NASCAR driver and owner, in Lakeland, Florida

September 27, 1963 (Friday)
Parliamentary elections were held in South Vietnam. No political parties were represented, and all 123 seats were filled by independents.
Electro-Mechanical Research successfully tested the compatibility of airborne and ground station PCM (pulse code modulated) telemetry equipment. The tests demonstrated that Gemini spacecraft and Agena telemeter and recorder formats were compatible with NASA ground stations.
A Development Engineering Inspection of the tow test vehicle (TTV), its associated wings, hardware, and mock-up, for the Paraglider Landing System Program was held at North American's Space and Information Systems Division. The TTVs (the contract called for two) were crewed vehicles to be flown with the wing predeployed to evaluate flight performance and control with particular emphasis on the landing maneuvers. The inspection resulted in 33 requests for alteration, 24 of them mandatory.
North American stopped its effort to retrofit the full-scale test vehicle (FSTV) to Gemini prototype paraglider deployment hardware. The contract for the Paraglider Landing System Program had provided for North American to incorporate Gemini equipment, insofar as possible, in the FSTV as it became available - this was the so-called retrofit. The decision to stop work on retrofit was made at a conference between North American and NASA on September 26; retrofit was deleted as a contract requirement on November 7 by Change Notice No. 5 to Contract NAS 9-1484.
The Houston Colt .45s became the only Major League Baseball team to play a regular season game with a team composed entirely of rookies. They were hosting the New York Mets, and lost, 10-3. The lineup included Joe Morgan, Jimmy Wynn and Rusty Staub, each of whom would score more than 250 home runs in their careers, and Aaron Pointer (brother of the singing group The Pointer Sisters). The Colts' pitcher was 17-year-old Jay Dahl, appearing in his first and only major league game; Dahl would die in an auto accident in 1965.
According to the Warren Commission, Lee Harvey Oswald arrived in Mexico City on this date and went to the consulate of Cuba, where he applied for a transit visa to travel to Cuba and then back to the Soviet Union, where he had lived from 1959 to 1962. After being refused visas by the Cuban consulate and the Soviet embassy, the Commission concluded, Oswald would return to his home near Dallas, Texas, after a few days.
The Scout X-2B rocket was launched from Point Arguello, California, carrying weather satellites, but failed to achieve orbit.
Born: Caren Metschuck, German Olympic champion swimmer, in Greifswald

September 28, 1963 (Saturday)
Jim Morrison, a 19-year-old student at Florida State University and future founder of the rock group The Doors, was arrested for the first of six times, after he and his friends stole items from a Tallahassee Police Department cruiser.  Morrison spent a night in jail, then paid a fifty dollar fine and continued his studies at FSU.
Born: Wei Wei, Mongolian pop singer, in Hohhot

September 29, 1963 (Sunday)
Stylianos Mavromichalis replaced Panagiotis Pipinelis as Prime Minister of Greece.
The second period of the Second Vatican Council in Rome opened.
The University of East Anglia was established in the United Kingdom at Norwich.
Joseph Kasavubu, the President of the Republic of the Congo (the former Belgian Congo, colloquially referred to as "Congo-Léopoldville"), dissolved that nation's parliament for the second time in less than four years, so that he and his allies could rule by decree.
Chilean sport diver Crisologo Urizar G. was attacked and killed by a large shark (probably a great white shark) at Bahía el Panul, south of Coquimbo, Chile. Urizar's remains were never recovered, although his damaged wetsuit jacket washed ashore.
My Favorite Martian, an American television sitcom starring Ray Walston and Bill Bixby, premiered on CBS.

September 30, 1963 (Monday)
The Pantone Color Matching System, developed in the United States, was introduced and would become "a de facto international colour standard" for printing companies around the world.
Manned Spacecraft Center awarded its first incentive-type contract to Ling-Temco-Vought, Inc., Dallas, Texas, for the fabrication of a trainer to be used in the Gemini launch vehicle training program. The fixed-price-incentive-fee contract had a target cost of $90,000, a target profit of $9,000, and a ceiling of $105,000. The incentive was based on cost only and provided for an 80/20 sharing arrangement; that is, the contractor would pay from his profit 20 percent of all savings under the target cost, or, alternatively, would receive 20 percent of all savings under the target cost. This meant that the contractor's profit would be zero after $97,500 was spent and would be minus if costs exceeded $105,000.
Air Force Space Systems Division contracted with Aerojet-General for a program to develop a backup for the injectors of the second stage engine of the Gemini launch vehicle. Titan II development flights had shown the stage II engine tended toward incipient combustion instability. The Gemini Stability Improvement Program, begun as a backup, became a program aimed at maximum probability of success on December 24, 1963. The 18-month program produced a completely redesigned stage II engine injector.

References

1963
1963-09
1963-09